Kaloeng (Kalerng, Kaleung) is a Southwestern Tai language of Thailand and Laos.

Distribution
In Thailand, Kaloeng is spoken in Sakon Nakhon Province, Nakhon Phanom Province, and Mukdahan Province (Trongdee 2016). In Laos, it is spoken in Khammouan Province.

External classification
Mudjalin Luksanawong classifies the Kaloeng language as part of the Sakon Nakhon subbranch of the Southwestern Tai.
Nakhon Phanom
Nakhon Phanom
Sakon Nakhon
Yoy-Yooy-Kalööng
Yoy
Yooy
Kalööng

In the Sakon Nakhon languages, Proto-Tai *hw- and *w- (Pittayaporn 2009:134-135) became /ph/- (Trongdee 2016:55). Also, the Sakon Nakhon languages display the uncommon labiovelar initial clusters thw-, cw-, sw-, hw-, ŋw-, lw-, ʔw- (Trongdee 2016:56).

Internal classification
Thananan Trongdee classifies the Kaloeng dialects as follows according to the evolution of the Proto-Kaloeng diphthong *-aɯ.

Group 1: *-aɯ > -aɯ (all spoken in Laos)
Hinboun District: Pha Wang; Nong Hoi
Yommalath District: Phon Bok
Nong Bok District: Nong Bok
Boualapha District: Kha Yu
Kounkham District: Kong Lo
(branch)
Group 2: *-aɯ > -əi
Mueang Sakon Nakhon District: Muanglai ม่วงลาย
Kut Bak District: Ban Bua บ้านบัว
Kusuman District: Saen Phan แสนพัน
Khamcha-i District: Non Sang Si
Group 3: *-aɯ > -ai
Mueang Sakon Nakhon District: Na Yo นายอ; Dong Mafai ดงมะไฟ
Phanna Nikhom District: Choeng Chum เชิงชุม
Mueang Nakhon Phanom District: Kurukhu กุรุคุ; Khamtoei คำเตย
Phon Sawan District: Phon Bok โพนบก
Tha Uthen District: Na Sok นาโสก
Pla Pak District: Kutakai ปลาปาก
Na Kae District: Phra Song พระซอง
Yommalath District, Laos: Don Pueai
Nong Bok District, Laos: Dong Phak Pue

References

Languages of Thailand
Languages of Laos
Southwestern Tai languages